The following lists events that happened during 1999 in New Zealand.

Population
 Estimated population as of 31 December: 3,851,100
 Increase since 31 December 1998: 22,500 (0.57%)
 Males per 100 Females: 96.5

Incumbents

Regal and viceregal
Head of State - Elizabeth II
Governor-General - The Rt Hon. Sir Michael Hardie Boys GNZM, GCMG, QSO

Government
The 45th New Zealand Parliament continued. until the general election, held 27 November for the 46th New Zealand Parliament starting 10 December. The governing National Party was defeated. The Labour Party, led by Helen Clark, in coalition with Alliance, led by Jim Anderton, formed the new government.

Speaker of the House - Doug Kidd then Jonathan Hunt
Prime Minister - Jenny Shipley then Helen Clark
Deputy Prime Minister - Wyatt Creech then Jim Anderton
Minister of Finance - Bill Birch then Bill English then Bill Birch then Michael Cullen
Minister of Foreign Affairs - Don McKinnon then Phil Goff
Chief Justice — Sir Thomas Eichelbaum (until 17 May), Sian Elias (starting 17 May)

Opposition leaders

See: :Category:Parliament of New Zealand, :New Zealand elections

National - TBD (Leader of the Opposition)
Greens - Jeanette Fitzsimons and Rod Donald
Act - TBD
New Zealand First - Winston Peters
United New Zealand - TBD

Main centre leaders
Mayor of Auckland - Christine Fletcher
Mayor of Hamilton - Russell Matthew Rimmington
Mayor of Wellington - Mark Blumsky
Mayor of Christchurch - Garry Moore
Mayor of Dunedin - Sukhi Turner

Events 
 The Animal Welfare Act 1999 is passed into law
 The Pohatu Marine Reserve was formally established
3 May: The Daily Telegraph and The Hawke's Bay Herald Tribune merge to form Hawke's Bay Today.
 11–15 September: State visit by United States President Bill Clinton to attend the 11th Asia-Pacific Economic Cooperation Leaders meeting; the second Presidential visit after Lyndon Johnson in 1966; see Visit.
11 October: United Nations Secretary-General Kofi Annan visits New Zealand.
 27 November: The last "dry" electorates in New Zealand (Eden, Roskill and Tawa) voted to go "wet" and to allow alcohol sales.
1 December: Changes to alcohol licensing in the Sale of Liquor Amendment Act: Sunday sales in on-licence and off licence premises, supermarkets could sell beer (they sold wine from 1989) and the drinking age dropped from 20 to 18; the changes were passed by Parliament, 59 to 55.

Arts and literature
Michael King and Paula Boock win the Robert Burns Fellowship.
Montana New Zealand Book Awards:
Montana Medal: Heather Nicholson, The Loving Stitch: A history of knitting and spinning in New Zealand
Deutz Medal: Elizabeth Knox, The Vintner's Luck
Reader's Choice: Elizabeth Knox, The Vintner's Luck
First Book Awards
Fiction: Willian Brandt, Alpha Male
Poetry: Kate Camp, Unfamiliar Legends of the Stars
Non-Fiction: Helen Schamroth, 100 New Zealand Craft Artists

See 1999 in art, 1999 in literature, :Category:1999 books

Music

New Zealand Music Awards
Winners are shown first with nominees underneath.

 Album of the Year: The Feelers - Supersystem
Che Fu - 2b S Pacific
Neil Finn - Try Whistling This
 Single of the Year: Che Fu - Scene III
The Feelers - Venus
Ardijah - Love So Right
 Top Male Vocalist: Neil Finn
Dave Dobbyn
James Reid (The Feelers)
 Top Female Vocalist: Betty-Anne Monga (Ardijah)
Sulata Foai (Te Vaka)
Alesha Siosiua (Urban Pacifika)
 Top Group: The Feelers
Ardijah
Shihad
 Most Promising Male Vocalist: Andrew Tilby (Breathe)
King Kapisi
Nathan King (Zed)
 Most Promising Female Vocalist: Boh Runga (Stellar*)
Liz Faalogo (NV)
Sina Saipaia
 Most Promising Group: Stellar*
Breathe
Zed
 International Achievement: Bic Runga
Neill Finn
The Feelers
 Best Music Video: Reuben Sutherland Wait & See (Shihad)
Sima & Makerita Urale- Sub Cranium Feeling (King Kapisi)
Mark Tierney & Fiona Champtloup - Unlikely (NV)
 Best Producer: Malcolm Welsford & The Feelers - Supersystem
Eddie Raynor - ENZSO 2
Che Fu & Andy Morton - 2b Spacific (Che Fu)
 Best Engineer: Andy Morton - 2BS Pacific (Che Fu)
Sam Gibson - Try Whistling This (Neil Finn)
Malcolm Welsford - Supersystem (The Feelers)
 Best Jazz Album: Chris White / Aaron Nevezie Quartet - Take Me With You
Wil Sargisson - Steppin'Out
Rodger Fox Quartet - Back To Being One
 Best Classical Album: Alexander Ivashkin - Under The Southern Cross
Tamas Vesmas - Debussy, Bartok Piano Music
New Zealand String Quartet - Bartok The Six Quartets
 Best Country Album: Barry Saunders - Magnetic South
Glen Moffat - A Place To Play
Home Tonight - Coalrangers
 Best Folk Album: Windy City Strugglers - On Top of the World
Gallowglass - Sparven
Philip Riley & Jayne Elleson - The Blessing Tree
 Best Gospel Album: Parachute Band - Always & Forever
Debbie Harwood and Friends - Angels - The New Zealand Christmas Album
Steve Apirana - It's Inevitable
 Best Mana Maori Album: Moana and the Moa Hunters - Rua
Hori Chapman - Toku Reo
Waihirere Maori Club - Waihirere -National Champions
Ngati Rangiwewehi - Wairua -Spirit of Ngati Rangiwewehi
 Best Mana Reo Album: Traditional Waiata - He Waiata Onemata (Songs From the Past)
Ngati Rangiwewehi - Wairua -Spirit of Ngati Rangiwewehi
Moana & The Moahunters - Rua
Waihirere Maori Club - Waihirere National Champions
 Best Children's Album: Jennifer Moss - Jennifer's Garden
David LaPlance - A Hand Full of Songs
Universal Children's Audio - Kori Kori / Busi Bodies / Lue Lue Mai
Tessarose Productions - Dancing to the Beat Volume 2
 Best Songwriter: James Reid - Venus (The Feelers)
Dave Dobbyn - Beside You
Neil Finn - She Will Have Her Way
 Best Cover: Elroy Finn - Try Whistling This (Neil Finn)
Marcus Ringrose - Supersystem (The Feelers)
Mark Roach & Andrew Durno - HLAH IV: Are You Gonna Kiss It Or Shoot It? (HLAH)
 New Zealand Radio Programmer Award: Melanie Wise - Q92FM Queenstown
Tony Neilsen -Radio Otago Group
Jo Hampton - NRG FM
Robert Taylor - Radio Hauraki

See: 1999 in music

Performing arts

 Benny Award presented by the Variety Artists Club of New Zealand to Gerry Merito.

Radio and television
The famous Toyota Hilux Bugger TV Commercial goes to air on New Zealand television for the very first time.
TVNZ sells its shareholding in SKY Network Television.  

See: 1999 in New Zealand television, 1999 in television, List of TVNZ television programming, :Category:Television in New Zealand, TV3 (New Zealand), :Category:New Zealand television shows, Public broadcasting in New Zealand

Film
Channelling Baby
I'll Make You Happy
Savage Honeymoon
Scarfies

See: :Category:1999 film awards, 1999 in film, List of New Zealand feature films, Cinema of New Zealand, :Category:1999 films

Internet

See: NZ Internet History

Sport
 See: 1999 in sports, :Category:1999 in sports

Athletics
Phil Costley wins his second national title in the men's marathon, clocking 2:17:43 on 24 October in Auckland, while Gabrielle O'Rourke claims her second as well in the women's championship (2:38:47).

Basketball
 Tall Blacks
 NBL (Men's) was won by the Auckland Stars

Cricket
Various Tours, New Zealand cricket team
 1999 Cricket World Cup held in England: New Zealand finished third in its pool and fourth in the super-six round before being beaten by Pakistan in the first semifinal.
 The Shell Trophy for 1998-99 was won by Canterbury, with Northern Districts runners-up.

Golf
New Zealand Open :Category:New Zealand golfers

Horse racing

Harness racing
 New Zealand Trotting Cup: Homin Hosed
 Auckland Trotting Cup: Happy Asset

Thoroughbred racing

Netball
 Silver Ferns
 National Bank Cup
 Netball World Championships

Rugby league

 The 1999 Tri Nations series was hosted by Auckland
 1999 Auckland Warriors season
 Bartercard Cup
 New Zealand national rugby league team
 Rugby League World Cup

Rugby union
:Category:Rugby union in New Zealand,
 Super 12
 Rugby Union World Cup
 National Provincial Championship
 Bledisloe Cup
 Tri Nations Series
 Ranfurly Shield

Shooting
Ballinger Belt – Rick Fincham (Upper Hutt)

Soccer
 The Chatham Cup is won by Dunedin Technical who beat Waitakere City F.C. 4–0 in the final.

Births

January–March
 7 January – Scott Gregory, rugby union player
 16 January – Michael Woud, association footballer
 18 January
 Ajeet Rai, tennis player
 Malia Steinmetz, association footballer
 20 January – Sarpreet Singh, association footballer
 27 January – Kaleb Trask, rugby union player
 19 February – Jacqui Hand, association footballer
 23 February – Emily Shearman, cyclist
 25 February – Nando Pijnaker, association footballer
 6 March – Mawene Hiroti, rugby league player
 12 March – Murray Taulagi, rugby league player
 23 March – Danny Toala, rugby union player
 29 March – Caleb Clarke, rugby union player

April–June
 3 April – Chanel Harris-Tavita, rugby league player
 4 April – Lwamba Chileshe, squash player
 10 April – Grace Jale, association footballer
 15 April – Dalton Wilkins, association footballer
 19 April – Connor Garden-Bachop, rugby union player
 22 April – Finn Allen, cricketer
 27 April – Joe Bell, association footballer
 30 April
 Callum McCowatt, association footballer
 Dallas McLeod, rugby union player
 10 May – Quinn Tupaea, rugby union player
 13 May – Alex Greive, association footballer
 14 May
 Miguel Porteous, freestyle skier
 Billy Proctor, rugby union player
 8 June – Dane Ingham, association footballer
 13 June – Maddi Wesche, shot putter
 29 June – Madison Doar, field hockey player

July–September
 2 July – Hayze Perham, rugby league player
 4 July – Lewis Clareburt, swimmer
 10 July – Naitoa Ah Kuoi, rugby union player
 20 July – Devan Flanders, rugby union player
 7 August – Emmerson Houghton, water polo player
 13 August – Eziyoda Magbegor, basketball player
 20 August
 Oregon Kaufusi, rugby league player
 Etene Nanai-Seturo, rugby union player
 3 September – Fergus Burke, rugby union player
 21 September
 Claudia Bunge, association footballer
 Katene Clarke, cricketer
 22 September – Finn Bilous, freestyle skier
 27 September – Lucky Owners, Thoroughbred racehorse

October–December
 7 October – Kate Heffernan, cricketer
 11 October – Leicester Fainga'anuku, rugby union player
 17 October – Gabrielle Fa'amausili, swimmer
 28 October – Campbell Pithie, cyclist
 30 October – Caleb Muntz, rugby union player
 9 November
 Tiarn Collins, snowboarder
 St Reims, Thoroughbred racehorse
 10 November – Matthew Fisher, cricketer
 16 November – Moeaki Fotuaika, rugby league player
 17 November – Ronaldo Mulitalo, rugby league player
 18 November – Rachin Ravindra, cricketer
 29 November – Bobbi Gichard, swimmer
 5 December – William Stedman, athlete
 12 December – Jakob Bhula, cricketer
 19 December – Elsu, Standardbred racehorse
 20 December – Cullen Grace, rugby union player
 30 December
 George Congreve, speedway rider
 Hazel Ouwehand, swimmer
 31 December
 Ellesse Andrews, racing cyclist
 Reid Walker, actor

Undated
 Keegan Smith, association footballer
 Grace Stratton, blogger, fashion entrepreneur

Deaths

January–March
 5 January – Michael Hirschfeld, businessman, politician (born 1944)
 17 January – Alister Hopkinson, rugby union player and coach (born 1941)
 20 January – Martyn Finlay, politician (born 1912)
 16 February – Don Hayward, rugby union and rugby league player (born 1925)
 8 March – Barney Clarke, boxer (born 1927)
 19 March – Freda Stark, dancer (born 1910)
 28 March – Doody Townley, harness-racing driver (born 1925)

April–June
 13 April – Ortvin Sarapu, chess player (born 1924)
 19 April – Doug Dillon, jurist (born 1924)
 28 April – Harold Wellman, geologist (born 1909)
 29 April – Barbara Bevege, cricketer (born 1942)
 30 April – Bruce Jesson, journalist, republican activist, politician (born 1944)
 9 May – Jeff Whittington, murder victim (born 1985)
 12 May – Dan Walls, theoretical physics academic (born 1942)
 17 May – Chris Corne, linguist (born 1942)
 21 May – Yvonne Lawley, actor (born 1913)
 22 May – Maxwell Fernie, organist, music teacher and conductor (born 1910)
 10 June – SIr Leonard Thornton, army officer (born 1916)
 12 June – Gerry Clark, sailer, writer, ornithologist (born 1927)
 25 June – Bill Rapson, chemist (born 1912)

July–September
 5 July – 
 Keith Bagley, rugby union player (born 1931)
 Len Butterfield, cricketer (born 1913)
 22 July – Syd Jensen, motorcycle racer, motor racing driver (born 1922)
 24 July – Rona McKenzie, cricketer (born 1922)
 2 August – Charles Rappolt, politician (born 1939)
 9 August – Les Riley, cricketer (born 1948)
 10 August – Jens Hansen, jeweller (born 1940)
 12 August – Wilfrid Kalaugher, athlete, cricketer, school teacher (born 1904)
 23 August – Frank Tredrea, cyclist (born 1920)
 24 August – Peter Mann, Anglican bishop (born 1924)
 31 August – Sylvia Potts, middle-distance athlete (born 1943)
 1 September – Joe Genet, wrestler (born 1914)
 5 September – Robert Arthur Owens, Mayor of Tauranga (born 1921)

October–December
 5 October – Jack Somerville, Presbyterian leader (born 1910)
 17 October – Ralph Grey, Baron Grey of Naunton, diplomat (born 1910)
 22 October – Martin Donnelly, cricketer (born 1917)
 25 October
 Rosalie Gascoigne, sculptor (born 1917)
 David Thomson, politician (born 1915)
 11 November – Bob Walls, artist (born 1927)
 14 November – Garth Harris, taxation law academic (born 1942)
 25 November – Sua Sulu'ape Paulo II, Samoan master tattooist (born 1950)
 1 December – Frank Newhook, plant pathology academic (born 1918)
 6 December – Sheikh Khalid Hafiz, Muslim cleric (born 1938)
 13 December – Peter Adams, actor (born 1938)

See also
List of years in New Zealand
Timeline of New Zealand history
History of New Zealand
Military history of New Zealand
Timeline of the New Zealand environment
Timeline of New Zealand's links with Antarctica

For world events and topics in 1999 not specifically related to New Zealand see: 1999

References

External links

 
1999 in Oceania
1990s in New Zealand
New Zealand
Years of the 20th century in New Zealand